Cavill may refer to:

People
Cavill family, Australian family known for its contributions to the sport of swimming
Cavill Heugh, Australian rugby footballer
Henry Cavill, (1983), British actor and model
Jim Cavill (c.1862-1952), Australian hotelier
Joy Cavill (1923–1990), Australian writer and producer

Other
Cavill Avenue, a street in Surfers Paradise, Queensland, Australia
Circle on Cavill, a $551 million commercial development, built by the Sunland Group

See also
Cavell (name), a related surname
Cavell (disambiguation)